"Time Has Come Today" is a hit single by the American psychedelic soul group the Chambers Brothers, written by Willie & Joe Chambers. The song was recorded and released as a single in 1966 by Columbia Records. It was then featured on the album The Time Has Come in November 1967, and released again as a single in December 1967. The 1967 single was a Top 10 near-miss in America, spending five weeks at No. 11 on the Billboard Hot 100 in the fall of 1968. In Canada, the song reached No. 9. It is now considered one of the landmark rock songs of the psychedelic era.

Background on the song
The song has been described as psychedelic rock, psychedelic soul and acid rock, and features a fuzz guitar twinned with a clean one. Various other effects were employed in its recording and production, including the alternate striking of two cow bells producing a "tick-tock" sound, warped throughout most of the song by reverb, echo and changes in tempo. It quotes several bars from "The Little Drummer Boy" at 5:40 in the long version.

Writer Chuck Eddy includes the song in a list of examples of "pre-dub dub metal".

Earlier version
The original version of the song, hastily recorded in late 1966, was rejected by Columbia. Instead, the more orthodox single "All Strung Out Over You" b/w "Falling In Love" (Columbia 4-43957) was released on December 19, 1966, and became a regional hit. The success of "All Strung Out Over You" gave them the opportunity to re-record "The Time Has Come Today" in 1967.

Album version
1967 released on the LP The Time Has Come - Columbia CK 63984–11:07, includes an extended "freak out" in the middle

Released single versions
1966 original version – Columbia 43816 - the original recording, 2:37 in length, which is completely different from the widely known 1968 "hit version".
1968 "hit version" #1 – Columbia 44414 – 3:05 edit of the LP version.  Fades out at the beginning of the "A" chord instrumental break with no other edits within the track.  The label does not refer to the album The Time Has Come.
1968 "hit version" #2 – Columbia 44414 – 4:45 edit.  The beginning of the "A" chord instrumental break is "overlapped" with its ending, followed by the third-verse reprise.  There are also several other edits within this version.  The label now mentions the album The Time Has Come (NOTE: Some copies with the 4:45 version were mispressed with the 3:05 labels)

Cover versions
 Würm on the B-side of their 1982 "We're Off / I'm Dead / Time Has Come Today" 7"-single.
Seminal punk rock band the Ramones covered the song on their 1983 album Subterranean Jungle; and was released as a single.
The song was rendered in a much changed way by Angry Samoans and included on their 1982 album, Back from Samoa.
The Smashing Pumpkins performed it live in 1988.
 Mark Edwards, of My Dad Is Dead, on the Homestead Records compilation Human Music in 1989.
Joan Jett for her 1990 album The Hit List.
 German new-wave band Bluefield on their 1991 album Struggling in Darkness. The song was also included on the sampler Zillo's mystic sounds Vol. 3 in 1992.
Willy DeVille on his 1995 album Loup Garou.
American Idol finalist Bo Bice for the anniversary of board game Monopoly.
Punk band Die' Hunns, on a 7" single and again on their 2004 album Long Legs.
Lords of Altamont on their 2005 album Lords Have Mercy.
Steve Earle and Sheryl Crow for the soundtrack to the 2000 film Steal This Movie! This version also appears on Earle's compilation album Side Tracks.
Garage punk rock band Dead Moon for their 1989 album Unknown Passage.
Greek punk garage rock The Last Drive for their 1989 EP Time.
Me'shell Ndegeocello for the soundtrack of the movie White Man's Burden which was released in 1995.
Bootsy Collins, exclusively for the 2015 comedy-horror television series Ash vs Evil Dead, which played over the credits of season one's seventh episode "Fire in the Hole".
Coco Robicheaux on his 2010 album Revelator.
Robert Post for the soundtrack of the documentary Gunnar Goes Comfortable (2003).
Pearl Jam performed it during their show at Wrigley Field in Chicago, Illinois, on August 22, 2016.
Too Slim and the Taildraggers on their 2018 album High Desert Heat on Vizztone.

In other media

Film
The song has appeared in many films. Director Hal Ashby used the full 11-minute track as the backdrop to the climactic scene when Captain Robert Hyde (Bruce Dern) "comes home" to an unfaithful wife (Jane Fonda) in the 1978 Academy Award winning film Coming Home.

Other films it has also been used in include the following:
 (1977)
Babylon Pink (1979)
Bad Dreams (1988)
Casualties of War (1989)
The Doors (1991)
Crooklyn (1994)
Girl, Interrupted (1999)
Remember the Titans (2000)
The Hebrew Hammer (2003)
Riding the Bullet (2004)
Edison Force (2005)
Nearing Grace (2005)
The Zodiac (2006)
Neal Cassady (2007)
Talk to Me (2007)
Yves Saint Laurent (2014)
Kong: Skull Island (2017)
Roman J. Israel, Esq. (2017)
On the Basis of Sex (2018)
Da 5 Bloods (2020)
Totally Under Control (2020)
Boss Level (2021)

Television
The song has also appeared in the following television episodes:
Theme tune used for the time-travel series Seven Days produced by UPN from 1998 to 2001
CSI: Crime Scene Investigation – "Ellie" (2001)
Cold Case – "The Runner" (2003)
Supernatural – "Everybody Loves a Clown" (2006)
My Name Is Earl – "Monkeys in Space" (2006)
A shortened version was used as a theme song for the fourth season of Early Edition.
Theme song for the PBS series American Experience from 2009 to 2010. It has since been succeeded by a calm piano theme (with some string and wind instruments).
Featured in the 13-episode miniseries by Stephen King titled Kingdom Hospital.
Featured in the First episode of the History Channel's Vietnam in HD.
Scandal (season 3) - "Icarus" (2013)
Featured in the opening of the first episode of the third season of Grey's Anatomy.
Bootsy Collins recorded a special version for the end credits of the seventh episode of Ash vs Evil Dead.
Season 2 finale of Outlander on July 9, 2016
Season 2 finale of Legends of Tomorrow on April 4, 2017 
Used in the "Dr Braino Show" on SCTV.
Closing song on the seventh episode of the first season of the TV show What We Do in the Shadows
Closing song on episode two of season two of Home Before Dark on June 18, 2021

In TV commercials:
A 2020 TV commercial for Amazon Web Services to mark the start of the 2020 NFL season.

Other
Anthony Bourdain said, in 2010, that this song 'saved his life'.

The song was also featured in the trailer for the 1995 film Kiss of Death and the 2017 film Geostorm.

References

The Chambers Brothers songs
Ramones songs
Protest songs
1966 singles
1967 singles
Columbia Records singles
Acid rock songs
Psychedelic rock songs